The 2000 Russian Indoor Athletics Championships was the 9th edition of the national championship in indoor track and field for Russia. It was held on 4–6 February at the WGAFC Indoor Stadium in Volgograd. A total of 26 events (13 for men and 13 for women) were contested over the three-day competition. It was used for selection of the Russian team for the 
2000 European Athletics Indoor Championships. 

The Russian Combined Events Indoor Championships was held separately on 18–20 February in Chelyabinsk at the Ural State University of Physical Culture arena.

Results

Men

Women

Russian Combined Events Indoor Championships

Men

Women

International team selection
Following the results of the championships, taking into account the qualifying standards, the Russian team for the 2000 European Athletics Indoor Championships included:

Men
60 m: Valeriy Kirdyashev, Dmitri Vasilyev, Sergey Bychkov
200 m: Valeriy Kirdyashev
400 m: Andrey Semyonov, Boris Gorban, Ruslan Mashchenko
4 × 400 m relay: Andrey Semyonov, Boris Gorban, Dmitry Golovastov, Ruslan Mashchenko, Oleg Kovalyov
800 m: Yuriy Borzakovskiy†, Sergey Kozhevnikov, Dmitry Bogdanov
1500 m: Vyacheslav Shabunin
3000 m: Sergey Drygin
60 m hurdles: Andrey Kislykh
High jump: Vjacheslav Voronin†, Pyotr Brayko, Aleksey Krysin
Pole vault: Vadim Strogalev
Long jump: Vitaliy Shkurlatov
Triple jump: Gennadiy Markov†, Igor Spasovkhodskiy, Sergey Kochkin
Shot put: Sergey Lyakhov

Women
60 m: Natalya Ignatova‡, Marina Kislova
200 m: Irina Khabarova, Yekaterina Leshcheva, Natalya Voronova
400 m: Natalya Nazarova†, Irina Rosikhina, Svetlana Pospelova
4 × 400 m relay: Natalya Nazarova, Irina Rosikhina, Svetlana Pospelova, Yuliya Sotnikova, Olesya Zykina
800 m: Natalya Tsyganova†
1500 m: Olga Kuznetsova, Yuliya Kosenkova, Lyubov Kremlyova
3000 m: Olga Yegorova†
60 m hurdles: Yuliya Graudyn
High jump: Viktorija Seregina, Olga Kaliturina, Viktorija Slivka
Pole vault: Yelena Isinbayeva, Yelena Belyakova, Svetlana Feofanova
Long jump: Olga Rublyova†, Tatyana Ter-Mesrobyan
Triple jump: Tatyana Lebedeva, Oksana Rogova
Shot put: Svetlana Krivelyova†, Larisa Peleshenko, Lyudmila Sechko
Pentathlon: Yelena Prokhorova, Irina Vostrikova

† Had exemption for selection and allowed not to compete at the national championships 
‡ Later withdrew from the international competition

References

Results

Russian Indoor Athletics Championships
Russian Indoor Athletics Championships
Russian Indoor Athletics Championships
Russian Indoor Athletics Championships
Sports competitions in Volgograd